Otoyol 22, abbreviated as O-22 and also known as Bursa–Sivrihisar Otoyolu, is a partly completed motorway in Turkey that will connect Bursa and Ankara in the future. The motorway starts at the Çağlayan intersection (O-5) and currently ends near Yenişehir at the State road D200. 

The remaining section will connect Yenişehir with Sivrihisar  via Bozüyük and Eskişehir. The project includes two tunnels (670m and 3570m), 26 viaducts (all together 13620 m) and 10 intersections. After its completion, the motorway will have a length of about 240 kilometres.

Exit List

See also
 List of highways in Turkey

External links
Bursa road map

Transport in Bursa Province
22